James Boyer (May 19, 1951 – June 15, 2022) was an American audio engineer, known for having recorded and mixed many recordings including Billy Joel's The Stranger, 52nd Street and The Nylon Curtain, and the soundtracks for Yentl and Silkwood, as well as producing Billy Joel's The Matter of Trust: A Bridge to Russia, Rupert Holmes' Partners in Crime and Peter Cetera's Peter Cetera.

Biography 

Boyer was born in Lebanon, Pennsylvania, and graduated from Cedar Crest High School and went on to earn a Bachelor of Electrical Engineering degree from the University of Delaware in 1973. During his high school and college years, he played keyboards in a number of east coast regional bands including Rain, which he was with from 1970–1975. Boyer attended and graduated from the Institute of Audio Research to prepare him for work in the business. His first job in the industry was at Phil Ramone's A&R Recording Studios where he was hired by Don Frey as an assistant engineer. Initially, he assisted on commercial jingles with engineers Elliot Scheiner and Don Hahn. Soon after, Boyer became Phil Ramone's assistant engineer. His first credit with Ramone was on the film A Star is Born with Barbra Streisand and Kris Kristofferson. Over the years, Boyer engineered many of Billy Joel's records including The Stranger, 52nd Street, The Nylon Curtain and An Innocent Man as well as produced Joel's documentary, The Matter of Trust: A Bridge to Russia and Концерт [live], Rupert Holmes' Partners in Crime featuring "Escape (The Piña Colada Song)" and "Him"/"Get Outta Yourself", and Peter Cetera's Peter Cetera.

In 1987, Boyer, along with David Dering, founded AmericanHelix, a primary CD manufacturer for the independent record label industry.  After it was sold, Boyer worked in Silicon Valley as a software services sales executive, and 2015 found him returning to Pro Tools studio mixing, live concert technical management and FOH mixing for a number of Bay area communities during their summer concert seasons.

Boyer died in the San Francisco Bay area of California on June 15, 2022.

Selected works 

Recording and mixing

1977 Celebrate Me Home – Kenny Loggins
1977 Never Letting Go – Phoebe Snow
1977 Marquee Moon – Television
1977 The Stranger – Billy Joel (Just The Way You Are-Grammy for Record and Song of the Year)
1977 Futures – Burt Bacharach
1977 Libby Titus – Libby Titus
1977 Watermark – Art Garfunkel
1978  Hot Streets – Chicago
1978 52nd Street – Billy Joel (Grammy for Album of the Year, Best Male Pop Vocal Performance)
1978 Angie – Angela Bofill
1978 Love Is The Stuff – Henry Gross
1978 Ruby Ruby – Gato Barbieri
1979 Chicago 13 – Chicago
1979 Partners in Crime – Rupert Holmes
1979 Browne Sugar – Tom Browne
1979 Ready and Waiting – Vivian Reed
1979 Morning Island – Sadao Watanabe
1980 Glass Houses – Billy Joel
1980 Out of Control – Peter Criss
1980 How's Everything – Sadao Watanabe
1980 Won't Let Go – Brooklyn Dreams
1980 Late In The Evening – Paul Simon
1981 Songs in the Attic – Billy Joel
1981 Peter Cetera – Peter Cetera
1981 Get Wet – Get Wet
1982 The Nylon Curtain – Billy Joel
1982 The Hunter – Joe Sample
 1982 In Harmony II – Various (Grammy for Best Recording for Children)
1983 An Innocent Man – Billy Joel
1983 Such is Love – Peter, Paul & Mary
1983 Rhythm Hymn – Whitren Cartwright
1984 Dangerous Moments – Martin Briley
1984 20/20 – George Benson
1984 Secrets & Sins – Luba
1985 Lovelines – The Carpenters
1985 Gettin' Away With Murder – Patti Austin
1986 The Bridge – Billy Joel
1986 Back in the High Life – Steve Winwood
1986 Only Love Remains – Paul McCartney
1987 Whitney – Whitney Houston
1987 At Home – Janis Siegel
1987  Концерт – Billy Joel
1988 Twice the Love – George Benson
1988 Talkin' 'Bout You – Diane Schuur
1990 No Separate Love – Roland Vazquez

Film scores and soundtracks

1976 A Star Is Born – Barbra Streisand and Kris Kristofferson
1980 One-Trick Pony – Paul Simon
1981 Arthur – Burt Bacharach
1983 Silkwood – Georges Delerue
1983 Yentl – Barbra Streisand
1983 Easy Money – Billy Joel
1987 Orphans – Michael Small
1988 The Serpent and the Rainbow – Olatunji

Broadway albums
1978 Eubie!
1980 Live from New York – Gilda Radner

Radio and television

1978 Saturday Night Live – Billy Joel
1978 Kennedy Center Inaugural Broadcast
1982 The Concert in Central Park – Simon and Garfunkel (post production)
1987 Live Broadcasts from Moscow and Leningrad

Production

 1979 Partners in Crime – Rupert Holmes
 1981 Peter Cetera – Peter Cetera
 1987The Matter of Trust: A Bridge to Russia – Billy Joel
1987 Концерт [live] – Billy Joel

References 

1951 births
2022 deaths
American audio engineers
Record producers from Pennsylvania
People from Lebanon, Pennsylvania